The Agrarian Party of Kazakhstan was a political party in Kazakhstan. The party remained  active for just under 7 years before it was dissolved on December 22, 2006, and incorporated into the new Nur Otan party.

History 
The Agrarian Party of Kazakhstan was founded on January 6, 1999. The party's aim was to protect the social, cultural, civil, political, and economic rights of rural residents and agricultural workers to promote the strengthening of statehood within the nation. The party consisted of primarily agricultural workers and farmers, private farms, and rural companies and associations.

The party was registered with the Ministry of Justice on March 16, 1999, and would re-register again on March 6, 2003. For the entire time of the party's existence, it's chairman was the deputy of the Mazhilis Romin Madinov. The party offices in the 12 regions of the nations and some cities, including Nur-Sultan and Almaty. At the party's peak, the party had more than 90,000 members. On December 22, 2006, the Agrarian Party of Kazakhstan was abolished and joined the Presidential People's Democratic Party "Nur Otan".

Election results 
In the 1999 Kazakh legislative election held on October 10 and October 24, the Agrarian Party received 663,351 votes or 13.56% of the popular vote, which provided the party with 3 out of the 77 seats in the Mazhilis. In the 2004 Kazakh legislative election held on September 19 and October 3, the Agrarian Party participated in the Agrarian and Industrial Union of Workers Bloc, which was formed jointly with the Civic Party of Kazakhstan. The bloc received 336,177 votes or 7.07% of the popular vote, which provided the bloc with 11 out of the 77 seats in the Mazhilis.

See also 
 List of political parties in Kazakhstan

References 

Defunct agrarian political parties
Defunct political parties in Kazakhstan